Frederick John Parker (6 September 1927 – 20 February 2022) was a British international hurdler known informally as Jumpin’ Jack Flash.

Athletics career
Parker competed at the 1952 Summer Olympics and the 1954 British Empire and Commonwealth Games. He was the silver medallist in the 110 metres hurdles at the 1954 European Athletics Championships. He represented England in the 120 yards hurdles at the 1954 British Empire and Commonwealth Games in Vancouver, Canada.

Engineering career
Jackson had a successful career as a civil engineer.

Personal life and death
Parker died on 20 February 2022, at the age of 94. He was survived by his wife, Shirley, as well as their children and grandchildren.

References

External links
 

1927 births
2022 deaths
Place of birth missing
Athletes (track and field) at the 1952 Summer Olympics
Athletes (track and field) at the 1954 British Empire and Commonwealth Games
Athletes (track and field) at the 1956 Summer Olympics
Commonwealth Games competitors for England
English male hurdlers
European Athletics Championships medalists
Olympic athletes of Great Britain